The Waziri is a breed of domestic sheep from the Waziristan region of Pakistan. They are also found in the Bannu District in Khyber-Pakhtunkhwa.

Description
The Waziri sheep is medium-sized, and has a white, muscular body and black head with small ears. It is considered to be a microsheep, as females weigh less than 25kg at maturity. It is part of the fat tailed sheep variety.

References

Sheep breeds originating in Pakistan
Waziristan